SS München was the name of a number of ships.

See also:
 

Ship names